Neve Ilan (lit. Oasis of Ilan) is a moshav shitufi in central Israel. Located west of Jerusalem, it falls under the jurisdiction of Mateh Yehuda Regional Council. Previously a kibbutz, it remains a member of the Kibbutz Movement despite its change in status to a moshav.

History

Kibbutz
The land on which Neve Ilan is located was purchased by the Jewish National Fund from an Arab effendi from Abu Ghosh at the urging of David Ben-Gurion in order to establish a "Kibbutz Army Post" to defend the Jerusalem road.

The initial 31 settlers were 17 young men and 14 young women, mostly Jewish immigrants from France and Europe. After a short spell working in Hadera they moved to Neve Ilan in October 1946; the settlement was initially a fortified post with bunkers and ammunition stores, with the residents living in tents, and later in two cabins. They used the effendi's stone house as their dining room, kitchen, and clinic.

At the end of November 1947, the road to Jerusalem was cut off, and the area from Neve Ilan to Hulda, the starting point of the caravans, was controlled by the Arabs, who dominated the hilltops overlooking Bab al-Wad all the way to the Neve Ilan plateau. On May 8, Palmach fighters, part of “Operation Macabee”, gathered at Neve Ilan in preparation for the attack on the village of Saris, and the western approach to Bab al-Wad.

In January 1952 a forest in memory of Count Folke Bernadotte was planted at Neve Ilan.

During the battles for the road to Jerusalem, a generator and perimeter lighting were set up at the kibbutz, in order to proclaim that a Jewish settlement was situated there. At the start of the 1948 Arab–Israeli War in late May 1948, the Jordanian Legion, based in Yalo, shelled Neve Ilan, causing heavy damage.

After Operation Nachshon and the battles for the road to Jerusalem, the settlers began construction at Neve Ilan. The original residents were joined by settlers from France and Algeria, who had survived the nightmarish voyage on the ship, Exodus.

In 1956, the kibbutz was disbanded and vacated, due to economic and social problems.

Moshav
In the late sixties, the Young Judeans in America sent a group to establish an industrial village in Israel. The members arrived in early 1970, and moved into the homes built by the Jewish Agency, with the settlement re-established as a moshav in 1971.

Economy
In addition to agriculture, the moshav operates a hotel, established in 1982. Neve Ilan is home to the GG Studios, a large media complex that houses film and television studios where various Israeli broadcasts stations produce their content.

Gallery

References

External links

Official website
Neve Ilan Sports Club
Hill in Judea - Story of Neve Ilan 1952 film by Jewish Agency uploaded from The Spielberg Jewish Film Archive

Moshavim
Former kibbutzim
Kibbutz Movement
Populated places established in 1946
Populated places established in 1971
Populated places in Jerusalem District
1946 establishments in Mandatory Palestine
1971 establishments in Israel
French-Jewish culture in Israel